Allak is a rural locality (a selo) and the administrative center of Allaksky Selsoviet, Kamensky District, Altai Krai, Russia. The population was 974 as of 2013. There are 13 streets.

Geography 
Allak is located 17 km east of Kamen-na-Obi (the district's administrative centre) by road. Plotinnaya is the nearest rural locality.

References 

Rural localities in Kamensky District, Altai Krai